Harper Woods High School is a public high school in Harper Woods, Michigan in Metro Detroit. It is a part of the Harper Woods School District.

Harper Woods High Schools was founded in 1951.

The current facility, which housed both middle school and high school levels, opened circa 2007. It was scheduled to be used as a filming site for the 2012 film Red Dawn.

 the campus had fewer than 700 students in the middle and high school levels.

Starting in the 2018–2019 school year only the high school was housed at this building, the Middle School relocating to space on the Triumph Church East Campus.

References

External links
 Harper Woods High School

Schools in Wayne County, Michigan
Public high schools in Michigan
1951 establishments in Michigan